Rudawa  is a village in Kraków County, Lesser Poland Voivodeship, Poland. In the years 1975-1998 it was in Kraków Voivodeship. The village is on the road from Kraków to Trzebinia and located by the Rudawa river.

Notable residents
 Henryk Sienkiewicz
 Adam Nawałka

References

Villages in Kraków County